"Brake My Wife, Please" is the twentieth episode of the fourteenth season of the American animated television series The Simpsons. It originally aired on the Fox network in the United States on May 11, 2003. Homer loses his driver's license and Marge has to do all the family's driving. She accidentally runs over Homer and now has to care for him, too. She discovers that she hates him. To show he loves her, Homer organizes a great barbecue in her honor.

Plot
After Homer leaves the family stuck at the hospital for hours because Marge couldn't contact him to bring in their health insurance card, she insists Homer purchase a cell phone. Homer quickly goes overboard with fun devices to go along with his new phone, but unfortunately that leads into a one-car accident caused by his recklessness, forcing Marge to do all the driving when Homer somewhat unfairly has his driver's license revoked. Homer is forced to walk everywhere, and despite being bitter at first, he begins to enjoy his new method of travel.

As Homer begins to enjoy walking, Marge begins finding her duty of driving everyone places increasingly stressful. One day, as Homer walks with other Springfieldians, Marge accidentally runs him over with her car.

As Homer is now completely reliant on Marge to care for him, their relationship suffers after Marge spills hot soup on Homer and then kicks out the cane he is using, leading a horrified Homer to state that Marge is now trying to hurt him on purpose. Marge admits she hates him, not only for losing his driver's license, but also for now taking her for granted. They see a marriage counselor who advises them to write down the people important to their lives, but Homer just writes his own name. As Marge sadly leaves, the counselor advises Homer to perform one completely unselfish gesture to win Marge back. Homer invites all the people of Springfield (except for the Flanders family, whom Homer tricks them into thinking Jesus wants to meet them in Montana) to the Simpson house for a backyard barbecue in Marge's honor.

Marge—returning in a foul mood after driving—walks to the backyard and is welcomed by everyone. After the barbecue, Marge tells Homer that she loves him. Homer and the other guests, including Jackson Browne, toast her before Homer turns on the sprinklers once dinner is over to get everyone to clear out.

References

External links

The Simpsons (season 14) episodes
2003 American television episodes